Tin Ping East is one of the 17 constituencies in the North District, Hong Kong.

The constituency returns one district councillor to the North District Council, with an election every four years. The seat has been currently held by Lau Ki-fung.

Tin Ping East constituency is loosely based on eastern part of the Tin Ping Estate and northwestern areas of Lung Yeuk Tau with estimated population of 17,073.

Councillors represented

Election results

2010s

2000s

1990s

References

Sheung Shui
Constituencies of Hong Kong
Constituencies of North District Council
1999 establishments in Hong Kong
Constituencies established in 1999